Hagetmau is a commune in the Landes department in Nouvelle-Aquitaine in southwestern France.

Sights

Population

Personalities
The sociologist Henri Lefebvre was born here in 1901.

References

See also
Communes of the Landes department

Communes of Landes (department)